David Blair (or Davy) (11 November 1874 – 10 January 1955) was a British merchant seaman with the White Star Line, which had reassigned him from the RMS Titanic just before its maiden voyage. Due to his hasty departure, he accidentally kept a key to a storage locker believed to contain the binoculars intended for use by the crow's nest lookout. The absence of any binoculars within the crow's nest is believed to be one of the main contributory factors in the Titanic’s ultimate demise.

Titanic posting and rearrangement
Blair, from Broughty Ferry, was originally appointed the second officer of Titanic. He had been with the ship during its trial voyages to test the ship's seaworthiness and the final journey from its place of construction in Belfast.

The White Star Line, however, decided that with the Titanic's sister ship, the RMS Olympic, currently undergoing layovers, to have the Olympic's Chief Officer, Henry Wilde take the position, citing his experience with ships of the Titanic class as a reason. Chief Officer William Murdoch and First Officer Charles Lightoller were thus demoted one step in rank, removing Blair from the command roster. Blair wrote about the disappointment of losing his position on the Titanic in a postcard to his sister-in-law days before the Titanic left for Southampton, remarking, "This is a magnificent ship, I feel very disappointed I am not to make her first voyage."

Key to the binoculars
When Blair left the Titanic on 9 April 1912, he took with him the key to the crow's nest locker, presumably by accident. This is believed to be a reason why there were no binoculars available with the crew during the voyage. According to other versions, the binoculars were not in the locker, but were left behind in his cabin, or he took them along with him when he left the ship, as they were his personal set of binoculars. The absence of binoculars being a factor in the sinking of the Titanic became a point of investigation in the subsequent inquiries into the sinking.

The lookouts at the time of the collision, Frederick Fleet and Reginald Lee, maintained during the inquiries that they were informed they were to have no binoculars during the voyage. According to legal expert Gary Slapper, though, Blair's "forgetfulness wasn't a material reason for the disaster" as there were other intervening causes.

The key itself survived and was donated by Blair's daughter to the International Sailors Society. On 22 September 2007, it was sold in a group of items including a postcard Blair wrote on board the Titanic via an auction held by Henry Aldridge, including a ticket from Belfast that fetched £32,000 and a postcard sent by a passenger which sold for £17,000. The key was purchased by Shen Dongjun, the CEO of jewellery retailer TESIRO's Chinese division for £90,000, and is currently on display in Nanjing.

On the importance of the key, the auctioneers said that it was a conjecture that the key could have saved the Titanic had it not left the ship. They also said that the money from the auction of the key will be used to set up bursaries and scholarships in Blair's name.

Later events
Blair was First Officer on the SS Majestic in 1913 when a coaler jumped overboard; the night before, a fellow crew member had succeeded in drowning himself. While a lifeboat was organized, Blair jumped into the ocean waters and swam toward the man, who was now swimming for the ship. Though the boat reached the man first, Blair was commended for his action in The New York Times and received money from the passengers and a medal from the Royal Humane Society.

Blair (and Charles Lightoller, who survived the Titanic disaster) served aboard the  when it ran aground in 1914. As the navigator, Blair received the blame for the grounding at the resulting enquiry.

Blair died on 10 January 1955 in Hendon, Middlesex.

Blair was survived by his son, Donald (a school teacher and author of Lake District hiking books). Don Blair felt considerable guilt during his entire life for the actions regarding his father being "bumped off the ship" and the issue with the keys to the binoculars. Don Blair has since also passed on, leaving a widow (Gladys) and three step sons (Neil, Nigel, and Iain Douglas).

References

1874 births
1955 deaths
British sailors
RMS Titanic survivors
People from Broughty Ferry
British Merchant Navy officers